Joshua Guttman is a controversial property owner who owns dozens of commercial and residential buildings throughout New York City.

Since 1990, at least five of his buildings have burned down due to arson, although Guttman himself was never charged. Guttman has been involved in a series of lawsuits with some of his former tenants, who have accused him of making his residences uninhabitable in order to force them out.

His son, Jack Guttman, helps to manage his properties through their company, Pearl Realty Management. Joshua Guttman also owns and operates Greendesk, a co-working and office rental company, which was originally started by Adam Neumann, former CEO and founder of WeWork. Guttman bought Greendesk from Neumann in 2009.

List of Properties owned by Joshua Guttman 

 247 Water Street in Dumbo, Brooklyn
 155 Water Street in Dumbo, Brooklyn
 195 Plymouth Street in Dumbo, Brooklyn
 202 Plymouth Street in Dumbo, Brooklyn
 68 Jay Street in Dumbo, Brooklyn
 67 West Street in Greenpoint, Brooklyn
 71 West Street in Greenpoint, Brooklyn
 42 West Street in Greenpoint, Brooklyn
 147 Prince Street in Downtown Brooklyn
 240 Kent Avenue in Williamsburg, Brooklyn
 29-28 41st Avenue in Long Island City, Queens
 34-18 N Blvd in Long Island City, Queens
 230 Manida St in Hunt's Point, Bronx

References

External links
 Commercial Tenants Desperate for Relief in Greenpoint

American landlords
American landowners
Year of birth missing (living people)
Living people